The Luscombe 4, also known as Luscombe Sprite or Luscombe 90, was a civil utility aircraft produced in small numbers in the United States in the late 1930s.

In 1936, Luscombe designed and began flying a simplified version of the Phantom known as the Luscombe 90, or Model 4.  Much of the Phantom's complex compound-curved sheet metal was eliminated in favor of simplified single-curved sheets, and the hand-formed fairings were eliminated. Performance was not impressive.

Specifications: Model 4 (Luscombe 90)

References

External links
1937 photo

1930s United States civil utility aircraft
04
High-wing aircraft
Single-engined tractor aircraft
Aircraft first flown in 1937